Derujinsky is a surname. Notable people with the surname include:

Gleb Derujinsky (1925–2011), American fashion photographer
Gleb W. Derujinsky (1888–1975), Russian-American sculptor